Dave Yovanovits (born March 6, 1981) is a former American football offensive lineman in the NFL most recently of the Detroit Lions. He played in every snap of 40 of 45 games for Temple University.  He was drafted in the 2003 NFL Draft by the New York Jets, whom he played for in 2003 and 2004. He was released by the Jets in order to reduce salary cap space when the team signed Ty Law in 2005. Yovanovits made his first career start in the Browns' 20-16 win over the Baltimore Ravens in their 2005 season finale. After briefly joining the Detroit Lions in December 2006, Yovanovits signed with the New Orleans Saints on February 16, 2007.

Yovanovits played high school football for Hopatcong High School in Hopatcong, New Jersey. He has been a resident of Stanhope, New Jersey.

References

External links
Scout.com interview

1981 births
Living people
People from Hopatcong, New Jersey
Sportspeople from Perth Amboy, New Jersey
People from Stanhope, New Jersey
American football offensive guards
Temple Owls football players
New York Jets players
Cleveland Browns players
Detroit Lions players